Cambridge Business Park is a large business complex in Cambridge, England, owned by the Crown Estate. It is home to many companies, mostly IT-related, such as Qualcomm, Autonomy, MathWorks and Red Gate Software, but also intellectual property firms such as Mewburn Ellis, Venner Shipley and Mathys and Squire.

It is close to Cambridge North railway station and the Cambridgeshire Guided Busway, as well as Cambridge Business Park and St John's Innovation Centre.

See also
 Silicon Fen
 Cambridge Science Park

External links

 Official website

Business Park
Business Park
Business Park
Business parks of England